Whistleblower is an American true crime television program that premiered on CBS on July 13, 2018. It is hosted by Alex Ferrer.

On May 17, 2019, it was announced that the second season would premiere on May 24, 2019. The show was not renewed for a third season.

Episodes

Season 1 (2018)

Season 2 (2019)

References

External links
 

Works about whistleblowing
2010s American documentary television series
2018 American television series debuts
2019 American television series endings
CBS original programming
CBS News
English-language television shows
Television series by CBS Studios
True crime television series